Fomboni Football Club is a football club from the Comoros based in Fomboni.

Achievements
Comoros Premier League: 3
 2001–02, 2014, 2019.

Comoros Cup: 1
 2015.

Comoros Super Cup: 0

Performance in CAF competitions
CAF Champions League: 2 appearances
2015 – Preliminary Round
2020 – Preliminary Round

CAF Confederation Cup: 0 appearance

Current Players

External links
Team profile – Comoros FF official website

Football clubs in the Comoros